Cedar may refer to:

Trees and plants
Cedrus, common English name cedar, an Old-World genus of coniferous trees in the plant family Pinaceae
Cedar (plant), a list of trees and plants known as cedar

Places

United States
 Cedar, Arizona
 Cedar, Indiana
 Cedar, Iowa
 Cedar, Kansas
 Cedar, Michigan
 Cedar, Minnesota, a community Oak Grove, Anoka County
 Cedar City, Utah
 Cedar, Mingo County, West Virginia
 Cedar, Raleigh County, West Virginia
 Cedar, Wisconsin, an unincorporated community
 Cedar County (disambiguation), multiple counties
 Cedar Township (disambiguation), multiple townships
 Cedar Station, Texas

Elsewhere
 Cedar, British Columbia, Canada
 Cedars of God, Lebanon, an ancient Cedrus libani forest and reserve, inscribed on UNESCO's list of World Heritage Sites

Ships
 , a Panamanian coastal trading vessel in service from 1955 to 1958
 USLHT Cedar, a United States Lighthouse Service lighthouse tender in commission in 1917 and from 1919 to 1939 which also saw service as:
 the United States Navy patrol vessel USS Cedar, in commission from 1917 to 1919
 the United States Coast Guard lighthouse tender USCGC Cedar (WAGL-207), in commission from 1939 to 1950

Other
 Cedar!, 1967 debut album by pianist Cedar Walton
 Cedar (Doves album), a 1998 extended play recording by Doves
 Cedar (name), a list of people and characters with the name
 Cedar (programming environment), an interpreted programming system developed at Xerox PARC
 Cedar Girls' Secondary School, Singapore
 Center of Excellence for Document Analysis and Recognition (CEDAR), a research laboratory at SUNY, Buffalo, New York, US
 Sony Ericsson Cedar, a mobile phone produced by Sony Ericsson
 Cedar College, a Reception to Year 12 Christian School in Adelaide, South Australia

See also
 Cedars (disambiguation)
 The Cedars (disambiguation)
 Cedar Creek (disambiguation)
 Cedar Forest, the realm of the gods in Mesopotamian mythology
 Cedar Grove (disambiguation)
 Cedar Hall (disambiguation)
 Cedar Lake (disambiguation)
 Cedar Park (disambiguation)
 Cedar River (disambiguation)
 Cedarvale (disambiguation)